Kurt Isaiah Perez (born December 1, 1997) is a Filipino former child actor. He became famous for being the Ultimate Male Survivor of StarStruck Kids, the reality-based talent search show of GMA in the Philippines.

Personal life
Kurt Isaiah Perez was born on December 1, 1997, in Cabanatuan, Nueva Ecija, Philippines. He is the youngest of the three children of Arlene Marcelo and Erwin Perez. He studied in Angelicum College.

Kurt migrated to Australia. He studied in Brisbane, Australia.

Career
In 2003, Perez did commercials with Sharon Cuneta for Colgate toothpaste and Ai-Ai delas Alas for Swift Sweet n' Juicy Hotdog. He joined the contest in StarStruck Kids (2004) with 14 finalists. He won as the Ultimate Male Survivor while Sam Bumatay won as Ultimate Female Survivor.

He played as the young Aguiluz in Mulawin TV series, older Aguiluz played by Richard Gutierrez, also stars Angel Locsin and Dennis Trillo, among others. In 2006, Perez was nominated as FAMAS Best Child Actor for the movie La Visa Loca starring Robin Padilla and Rufa Mae Quinto.

Filmography

References

External links

1997 births
Living people
Filipino male child actors
Reality show winners
People from Cabanatuan
Male actors from Nueva Ecija
Participants in Philippine reality television series
StarStruck Kids participants
GMA Network personalities